The Border or Upper Tami languages are an independent family of Papuan languages in Malcolm Ross's version of the Trans–New Guinea proposal.

Unlike the neighboring Sepik languages and many other Papuan language families of northern New Guinea, Border languages do not have grammatical gender or number (dual and plural forms).

Name
The Border family is named after the Indonesia – Papua New Guinea border, which it spans. Other than the Border languages, the Skou, Senagi, Pauwasi, Anim, and Yam families also span the Indonesia – Papua New Guinea border.

Classification history
Cowan (1957) tentatively proposed a "Tami" family, named after the Tami River, that included the modern Border and Sko language families. Some of the previously unclassified languages did turn out to be Sko, and were added to that family; the remainder (including the languages of the upper Tami) constitute the Border family.

Languages
Laycock classified Morwap as an isolate, but noted pronominal similarities with Border. Ross included Morwap in Border but noted that they do not appear to share any lexical similarities. However, his Morwap data were quite poor. Usher included it as a branch of Border.

Foley (2018)
Foley (2018) provides the following classification.

Border family
Taikat: Auyi, Taikat
Bewani: Ainbai, Kilmeri, Ningera, Pagi
Waris: Amanab, Auwe (Simog), Daonda, Imonda, Manem, Senggi (Viid), Waina (Sowanda), Waris

Usher (2020)
The Border languages are:

He does not mention Ningera, subsuming it into another language.

Pronouns
The pronouns that Ross (2005) reconstructs for proto-Border are the following:

{| class=wikitable
|-
| rowspan=2| I || rowspan=2| *ka || exclusive we || *kia- ?
|-
| inclusive we || *bile ?
|-
| thou || *je || you || ?
|-
| s/he || *ihe || they || *ihe- ?
|}

Foley (2018) lists pronouns for the following five Border languages.

{| 
|+ Border family pronouns
!  !! Taikat !! Kilmeri !! Amanab !! Waris !! Imonda
|-
! 1incl
|  || nuko || bi || pi || pəl
|-
! 1excl
| ku || ko || ka || ka || ka
|-
! 2
| kebe || de ~ ne || ne || ye || ne
|-
! 3
| yɛ || ki || ehe || hi || ehe
|}

Cognates
Border family cognates (Awyi, Taikat, Kilmeri, Waris, Imonda) listed by Foley (2018):

{| 
|+ Border family cognates
! gloss !! Awyi / Taikat !! Kilmeri !! Waris / Imonda
|-
| ‘bone’ || sagər || kili || kəl
|-
| ‘cloud’ || tik ||  || tik
|-
| ‘eat’ || na- || ni- || ne-
|-
| ‘egg’ || sur || su || sui
|-
| ‘eye’ || nondof || dob || nof
|-
| ‘house’ || ya || yip || yɛf
|-
| ‘moon’ || usɛ || wɪs || wɛs
|-
| ‘sun’ || kɛwom ||  || ɒkɒmba
|-
| ‘tongue’ || mariel || ber || məde
|-
| ‘tooth’ ||  || lu || lɒ
|-
| ‘tree’ || di || ri || ti
|-
| ‘water’ || obea || pu || po
|}

Vocabulary comparison
The following basic vocabulary words are from Voorhoeve (1971, 1975), as cited in the Trans-New Guinea database:

{| class="wikitable sortable"
! gloss !! Awyi !! Taikat !! Manem !! Sowanda !! Viid !! Waris
|-
! head
| naŋger; naŋgər || bagər || bagar || mosok || repek || ku
|-
! hair
| jento; ta || bakta; tar; tat || ta || mog-tse; mog-tše ||  || tea; tɛa
|-
! ear
| keato || keat || kafŋe || oŋgok || aten || aŋku
|-
! eye
| najo; nayo || nondor || nof || rugok || now || nop
|-
! nose
| nubru || nakan || past || bosok || peŋe || lomus
|-
! tooth
| ka || kaembi || so ||  || nunalk || lelo
|-
! tongue
| marie ||  || mte || melik || ro || minde
|-
! leg
| malke || təka || mogor || miŋgak || moŋla || moŋgola
|-
! louse
| tu ||  ||  || kue || ku || ku
|-
! dog
| eəl; wŋl || ur ||  || ure; urê || wandr || unde
|-
! pig
| wot || wot || aŋ; ar || ogtse || sar mejan; sar meyan || mi
|-
! bird
| noj; noy || nor || joŋ jor; yoŋ; yor || teafu ||  || tuawa
|-
! egg
| suŋul || sur || suiŋ; suir || suk || tu || suul
|-
! blood
| keane || jafor; yafor || psoŋko || tap || nine || towol
|-
! bone
| sakər || sagər || kaŋ; kar || kek || ke || kəi; kəl
|-
! skin
| fəker || fager; fagɛr || tofŋo; tofro || lopok || kep || towol
|-
! breast
| mə̃ || mɛ || maŋ; mar || tot || mandr || tɛt
|-
! tree
| ti || di || ti ||  || ti || ti
|-
! man
| kir || kir || knigiŋ; knigir || owak || du || tənda
|-
! woman
| kuru || koraha || jaman || uŋwabe || jemena || ŋguabe
|-
! sun
| mentao || kewom; kɛwom || usam || okomba || pola || okumba
|-
! moon
| kuŋgəru || usɛ || wes || wules || wos || wɛs
|-
! water
| wobia; wobio || obea || pu || poa || po || po
|-
! fire
| tao || dow || saw || sue || tow || sue
|-
! stone
| ser || sər || suk || xun || kwondr || hon
|-
! road, path
| məŋgir || meo || monofo || mna || mona || muna
|-
! name
|  ||  ||  || unha ||  || nabae
|-
! eat
| anɛ; na || na || na || nekem; nɛkɛm || na || ne
|-
! one
| maŋgua || ŋgoa; [ŋgoa] || gueno || moŋgoir || moŋgau || muŋasəl
|-
! two
| naŋger ||  || sampaŋ || sambaga || tambla || sambla
|}

Migration history
200–250 years ago, Bewani speakers rapidly expanded and migrated towards neighboring regions, which started off chain migrations among various peoples of the region. The migration of Bewani speakers split up the territory of Kwomtari speakers, and Fas was displaced to the swampy area of Utai. The displaced Fas speakers then expanded further east into One territory, causing conflicts between the Fas and One peoples in the Kabore area.

The Pagei, Bewani, Bo, and Ningera peoples expanded down the Pual River to displace speakers of Inner Skou and Serra Hills languages. Inner Skou speakers were then forced to migrate, displacing Barupu/Warapu speakers (Piore River branch). Bewani speakers, however, were not able to expand eastward into the lowland swampy areas occupied by Busa and Yale speakers, who were themselves pushed out of the more fertile hills into the lowland swamps. Westward expansion of Bewani speakers was halted by fighting in Kaure territory.

References

External links
Border languages database at TransNewGuinea.org

 
Northwest Papuan languages
Languages of western New Guinea
Languages of Sandaun Province
Language families